Dun Cruinn is a prehistoric site about  north-west of Portree, on the Isle of Skye, Scotland. It is on the Skerinish Peninsula, between Loch Snizort Beag and Loch Eyre.

Description
It is divided about midway by a rampart and ditch.

References

Hill forts in Scotland
Archaeological sites in Highland (council area)
Scheduled Ancient Monuments in Highland
Prehistoric sites in Scotland